Murphysburg Historic District is a national historic district located at Joplin, Jasper County, Missouri.   The district encompasses 185 contributing buildings in a predominantly residential section of Joplin.  It developed between about 1880 and 1965 and includes representative examples of Queen Anne, Richardsonian Romanesque, Classical Revival, Mission Revival, Colonial Revival, and Tudor Revival style architecture. Located in the district are the previously listed Olivia Apartments and Ridgway Apartments. Other notable buildings include the J.H. Brand House (1899), John Wise House (1898), A.B. McConnell House (c. 1899), H.H. McNeal House (1908), H. Edward Dangerfield House (1895), First Methodist Church (1905), and Second Church of Christ, Scientist (c. 1907).

It was listed on the National Register of Historic Places in 2015.

References

Historic districts on the National Register of Historic Places in Missouri
Queen Anne architecture in Missouri
Richardsonian Romanesque architecture in Missouri
Neoclassical architecture in Missouri
Mission Revival architecture in Missouri
Colonial Revival architecture in Missouri
Tudor Revival architecture in Missouri
Buildings and structures in Joplin, Missouri
National Register of Historic Places in Jasper County, Missouri